Golcar (pronounced 'Go Car' or 'Golker') is a village on a hillside crest above the Colne Valley in West Yorkshire, England,  west of Huddersfield, and just north of the River Colne and the Huddersfield Narrow Canal. 

The 2021 population census lists the village as having 18,725 pemanent residents. . The main transport access is from the A62 (Manchester Road), through Milnsbridge in the valley bottom or via Scapegoat Hill from the A640 (New Hey Road) at the top of the hill.

The township of Golcar consists of Bolster Moor, Golcar, Wellhouse, Pole Moor and Scapegoat Hill.

History
Named after St Guthlac, who preached in the area during the 8th century, its name is recorded in the Domesday Book of 1086 as Goullakarres. During the Industrial Revolution Golcar became an important centre for weaving.  Pharmacologist James Burrows grew up in the area.

The village has been a site of extensive dialect research.  It was first a site in the English Survey of English Dialects, and later a site in the Atlas Linguarum Europae.

Colne Valley Museum

Three 1840s weavers' cottages were converted into the Colne Valley Museum in 1970. The museum has several restored period rooms which are used to show temporary exhibitions. The museum was extended in 2008 following the purchase of the adjoining former fish and chip shop.

Exhibits include a handloom and a spinning jenny, invented by James Hargreaves. In the loom chamber, spinning room, weavers sitting room and 'gas-lit' cloggers shop, the volunteer helpers give demonstrations of the type of crafts that would have existed during the 19th century.

The museum is run by volunteers and opens at weekends and bank holidays. Various craft and working weekends are held through the year.

Community facilities
Golcar supports two scout groups: the 4th Golcar Scout Group, which was founded in 1951 and the 39th Parkwood Scout Group, founded in 1908.

The village has several sporting teams including football and cricket teams (Golcar who play in the Huddersfield Cricket League and Leymoor who play in the Halifax Cricket League).

The village has three churches, the Anglican Parish Church of St John the Evangelist opened in 1829  and is a good example of a Waterloo church,  Golcar Baptist Church, founded in 1835 and Golcar Providence Methodist Church founded in 1876.

Each year in early May the village hosts the Golcar Lily Day.

Golcar Brass Band was reformed in 1977 and practises at the Baptist Church on a Monday night.

Schools
 Golcar Junior, Infant & Nursery School, Manor Road, Golcar, Huddersfield HD7 4QE
 St. John's C of E Junior & Infant School, Leymoor Road, Golcar, Huddersfield HD7 4QQ
 Beech Primary, Beech Avenue, Golcar, Huddersfield HD7 4BE
 Wellhouse Junior & Infant School, Lower Wellhouse, Golcar, Huddersfield HD7 4ES
 Clough Head Junior & Infant School, Bolster Moor Road, Golcar, Huddersfield HD7 4JU
 Scapegoat Hill Junior & Infant School, School Road, Scapegoat Hill, Golcar, Huddersfield HD7 4NU

See also
Listed buildings in Golcar

References

Image gallery

Areas of Huddersfield
Colne Valley